
The Korotangi (bird of sorrow) is a taonga or sacred artifact discovered in New Zealand. It is a carving of a bird made in serpentine stone. Some Māori of Tainui allegiance believe that it was brought to the country from Hawaiki in their ancestral waka, but it is carved with metal tools which the Polynesians did not have. It has no similarity to any other manufactured piece in Oceania. Its origin is a mystery.

Physical description
The stone is a non-specific serpentine, weighs 2097 grams, is 26 cm long and appears to be carved with metal tools. It depicts a bird which seems to be a fusion of a petrel (possibly a Broad-billed Prion), a duck, and a dove or pigeon.

History
The statue was discovered among the roots of a manuka tree blown over in a storm in 1878. The location was near Aotea Harbour, traditional landing place of the Tainui waka (c.1350).
This was the story of its finding given at the time by Mr Albert Walker, who claimed it was found by a local Māori, although there are other versions. He offered it for sale to a local Cambridge antique and ethnographic dealer, Major Drummond-Hay. It was then purchased by Major John Wilson, as a present to his Māori wife, Te Aorere, for 50 pounds. It is claimed that the carving was referred to in a number of poems or laments about its loss, and that several chiefs were extremely moved by its rediscovery.

The Wilson family later deposited the carving with Dominion Museum.  By 1995 it was kept at its successor, Te Papa, from where it was returned to Tainui by  Prime Minister Jim Bolger as part of the government's settlement of their claims under the treaty of Waitangi. The Wilson family apparently disputes the government's authority to done so.

Tuheitia Paki, the current Maori King, named his second child Korotangi, after this taonga.

References

Bibliography

Māori art
Sculptures of birds
Animal sculptures in New Zealand
Tainui